West Bay Lagoon, also known as Leqtaifiya (also spelled as Legtaifiyah or Al Qutaifiya) is a district of Doha, the capital city of Qatar. Spanning from the Doha Corniche to West Bay Lagoon, the area has villas on one side, and low rises on the other. The district is well known for its luxurious waterfront villas, which are some of the most expensive in the country. As one of the few freehold areas in Doha, properties are available for purchase by non-Qataris.

Together with Onaiza and Al Qassar, it makes up Zone 66 which has a total population of 22,024.

Transport
It is part of Doha Metro's Red Line North.

Education
The following schools are located in West Bay Lagoon (Leqtaifiya):

Gallery

References

Doha
Communities in Doha